The Northern Championship is an association football (soccer) league in Northern Tasmania. Nationally it sits under the A-League and NPL Tasmania, equal to the Southern Championship.  It is controlled by the Football Federation Tasmania (FFT), the state's governing body. 

Prior to the 2015 season it was known as the Northern Premier League and for sponsorship reasons as the Forestry Tasmania Northern Premier League.  Between 2001 and 2012 the Southern and Northern Premier Leagues were the state's highest level of soccer competition. In this period the top four teams from the Northern Premier League and the top four teams from the Southern Premier League play-off in a knock-out final series to decide the state champion. This system came into existence in 2009 and replaced the previous system whereby the Northern and Southern champions played off.  The Northern Championship is determined by the team finishing top of the ladder being named league champion, in contrast to many Australian competitions which use a finals series.

There is no promotion or relegation in the Northern Championship.

2020 Northern Championship clubs

Honours

External links
 Football Federation Tasmania – official website
 Football Federation Tasmania – champions stats
 Weltfussballarchiv
 Northern Premier League Unofficial Blog

Soccer leagues in Tasmania
Recurring sporting events established in 1912
1912 establishments in Australia
Sports leagues established in 1912